MiniMini+  is a Polish television channel owned and operated by ITI Neovision SA.  Its programmes are aimed primarily at children aged 3–8.

History
Before the launch of MiniMini, Minimax (now known as Teletoon+) launched a programming block for preschoolers, known as MiniKaruzela, on 24 December 2000.

MiniMini was launched on 20 December 2003 as a preschool channel by Cyfra+. However, MiniKaruzela continued to be broadcast on Minimax until 10 April 2004, when some programmes were moved to MiniMini.

On 11 November 2011, MiniMini became MiniMini+.

In 2014, Canal+ Cyfrowy was integrated to ITI Neovision SA (bought in 2013 by the Canal+ Group).

MiniMini+ has a mascot named Rybka, a happy sunshine yellow fish.

External links
www.miniminiplus.pl

Children's television networks
Television channels in Poland
Television channels and stations established in 2003
Canal+ Premium
Preschool education television networks